The Champlain–St. Bernard de Lacolle Border Crossing connects Champlain, New York, and St-Bernard-de-Lacolle, Quebec, on the United States–Canada border. It is the terminus of Interstate 87 in the US and Quebec Autoroute 15 in Canada. The route is the primary corridor between Montreal, which is less than 30 miles from the border, and New York City. The crossing is among the busiest in the US; more than two million travelers use it annually, including more than half a million during July and August. and is the second-busiest USA-Canada border crossing that is not located at a bridge. This crossing is open 24 hours per day, 365 days per year.

It is sometimes locally referred to as the Blackpool Border Crossing, after the old crossing on U.S. Route 9 upon its own terminus, Meridian Road, also in Champlain.

See also
 List of Canada–United States border crossings

References

Canada–United States border crossings
Geography of Clinton County, New York
Geography of Montérégie
Interstate 87 (New York)
1967 establishments in New York (state)
1967 establishments in Quebec